Makers: The New Industrial Revolution is the third book written by Chris Anderson, Editor in chief of Wired magazine. The book was published on October 2, 2012, by Crown Business. He is also the author of  The Long Tail,  published in 2006. Makers focuses on a new industrial revolution as modern entrepreneurs, using open source design and 3-D printing, bring manufacturing to the desktop.

The book is largely based on his 2010 article, "In the Next Industrial Revolution, Atoms Are the New Bits". The ideas he portrayed, such as crowdsourcing of ideas, utilization of available lower-cost design and manufacturing tools, and reviewing options to outsource capital-intensive manufacturing were highlighted in the February 2010 Harvard Business Review article, "From Do It Yourself to Do It Together".

Overview

References

External links
Review in The Guardian
Chris Anderson's blog

2012 non-fiction books
Business books
Works about the information economy